The Commission on the Future of the United States Aerospace Industry (CFUSAI) was formed jointly by United States President George W. Bush and the United States Congress in 2001. Its first public meeting was held on November 27, 2001, and its final report was given on November 18, 2002.

Introduction 
An excerpt from the introduction of the Interim Report #2 of the commission:

The Commission on the Future of the United States Aerospace Industry was established by Section 1092 of the Floyd D. Spence National Defense Authorization Act for fiscal year 2001, Public Law 106-398. It was formed to study the future of the U.S. aerospace industry in the global economy, particularly in relationship to U.S. national security; and to assess the future importance of the domestic aerospace industry for the economic and national security of the United States.

Commissioners 
The Commission consisted of 12 members, six of whom were appointed by the President, and six appointed by Congress (three from the House and three from the Senate).

Presidential appointees 
Buzz Aldrin - former astronaut
Ed Bolen - President of General Aviation Manufacturers Association
John W. Douglass - former Assistant Secretary of the Navy
Neil deGrasse Tyson - astrophysicist
Robert Smith Walker - former U.S. Representative from Pennsylvania
Heidi Wood - Managing Director, Morgan Stanley
Executive Director - Charles H. Huettner

Senate appointees 
John Hamre
William Schneider, Jr.
Robert J. Stevens - Chairman, President, and CEO of Lockheed Martin

House appointees 
Tom Buffenbarger - President of the International Association of Machinists
F. Whitten Peters
Tillie K. Fowler

Reports 
The commission produced three interim reports and a final report.

 Interim report #1 - December 18, 2001
 Interim report #2 - March 20, 2002
 Interim report #3 - June 26, 2002
 Final report - November 18, 2002

Meetings 
The commission held six public meetings to hear testimonies and gain different perspectives.  The first meeting was held on November 27, 2001, where the commission heard testimonies from the Administration, Congress, and the Executive Branch.  The second meeting was held on February 12, 2002, which consisted of Air Transportation Capacity / Infrastructure discussions, and well as Export Control discussions. The third meeting was held on May 14, 2002, and included discussions on Space, including a testimony from Sean O'Keefe.

The three other public meetings were held on August 22, 2002, September 17, 2002, and October 23, 2002.

See also 
 President's Commission on Implementation of United States Space Exploration Policy

References 

Reports of the United States government
NASA oversight